Carolyn Meyer (born June 8, 1935) is an American author of novels for children and young adults.

The typical genre for her work is historical fiction, one of her more popular projects being the Young Royals series, each novel of which tells the story of a different crown princess (duchess, in the case of Catherine de Medici, and lady, in the case of Anne Boleyn) of her home country; either Egypt, England, Italy, Scotland, Austria and France. 

For example, one of Carolyn Meyer's works is Duchessina, which is the story of the troubled childhood and young adulthood of the Italian duchess Catherine de' Medici up to her meeting with Crown Prince Henry of France. One recent novel in the Young Royals is Victoria Rebels, which is about the teenage Princess Victoria of Kent and her budding relationship with Prince Albert of Germany.

Early life
Born June 8, 1935, as an only child in Lewistown, Pennsylvania, Meyer began her first "novel," Humpy the Caterpillar and Gladys the Snail: A True Life Romance at age eight. However, she completed only three chapters.

Career
Meyer's latest work published is Beauty's Daughter: The Story of Hermione and Helen of Troy, published October 2013.

Her previous published work was The True Adventures of Charley Darwin, focusing on the life of Charles Darwin, quite a leap from her usual subjects, for she has gone from royalty, to European artists, and now to scientists. The True Adventures of Charley Darwin is unusual in that it breaks from Meyer's formula of always having a female narrator, as Charley narrates his own story. The hardcover version of this book was published on January 26, 2009. Before Darwin came In Mozart's Shadow, a historical novel about Mozart and narrated by his older sister, Maria Anna Mozart, nicknamed Nannerl, released in 2008.

Personal life
Mother to three grown sons, she resides in Albuquerque, New Mexico. Her husband, E.A. "Tony" Mares, a New Mexico poet, essayist and historian, and professor at the University of New Mexico, died January 30, 2015.

Novels

References

External links
 
 Interview at publisher Harcourt 
 

1935 births
20th-century American novelists
20th-century American women writers
21st-century American novelists
21st-century American women writers
American young adult novelists
American historical novelists
American women novelists
Living people
Writers from Albuquerque, New Mexico
People from Lewistown, Pennsylvania
Novelists from Pennsylvania
Women writers of young adult literature
Women historical novelists
Writers of historical fiction set in the early modern period